Theodore McCord (born May 17, 1907, Birmingham, Alabama; date of death unknown) was an American jazz reedist, principally active in the 1920s and 1930s.

McCord was the twin brother of Castor McCord, also a reedist; while both brothers played tenor saxophone and clarinet, Ted played alto saxophone in addition. He was a student at Wilberforce University in the 1920s, where he played in a student group led by Horace Henderson. He also played in Edgar Hayes's group, the Blue Grass Buddies, as well as McKinney's Cotton Pickers and the Mills Blue Rhythm Band, including for their sessions with Louis Armstrong. Other credits include recordings with King Carter and the singer Ollie Shepard.

References

American jazz saxophonists
American male saxophonists
1907 births
Year of death missing
Jazz musicians from Alabama
American male jazz musicians
Mills Blue Rhythm Band members
McKinney's Cotton Pickers members